Evgeny Lobanov (born June 25, 1984) is a Russian professional ice hockey goaltender. He is currently playing for Avtomobilist Yekaterinburg of the Kontinental Hockey League.

External links

1984 births
Living people
Avtomobilist Yekaterinburg players
HC Spartak Moscow players
Lokomotiv Yaroslavl players
Russian ice hockey goaltenders
Torpedo Nizhny Novgorod players
Sportspeople from Arkhangelsk